Baseball steak is a center cut of beef taken from the top sirloin cap steak.  Baseball steaks differ from sirloin steaks in that the bone and the tenderloin and bottom round muscles have been removed; and the cut is taken from biceps femoris.  A baseball steak is essentially a center cut top sirloin cap steak.  This cut of beef is very lean, and is considered very flavorful.

The USDA NAMP / IMPS codes related to this subprimal cut are 181A and 184. 181A is obtained from 181 after removing the bottom sirloin and the butt tender (the part of the tenderloin which is in the sirloin). 184 is obtained from 182 after removing the bottom sirloin. The foodservice cuts from 184 are 184A through 184F, its portion cut is 1184 and, the "subportion" cuts from 1184 are 1184A through 1184F. 181A is not further divided into foodservice cuts.   Baseball steaks are made primarily from cut 184F. In Australia, this cut is called D-rump in the Handbook of Australian Meat and assigned code 2100.

Etymology

The name "baseball steak" refers to the shape of the steak following cooking, since a baseball steak is essentially a center cut top sirloin. After it has been cooked, the center domes and swells and forms a rounded shape similar to a baseball.

Cooking styles
Baseball steak is usually served grilled, broiled, sautéed, or pan fried.  It is considered more flavorful to prepare a baseball steak cooked to the medium or medium rare stage.

Nutrition 
A baseball steak per ounce contains 57 calories, 3 grams of fat, and 6 grams of protein. Like other red meats it also contains iron, creatine, minerals such as zinc and phosphorus, and B-vitamins: (niacin, vitamin B12, thiamin, riboflavin), and lipoic acid.

See also

 List of steak dishes
 Top sirloin

References

Cuts of beef